Anthony Lorinthia von Geriasarch (1493–1582) was a Prussian general who served under the courts of the Polish king Sigismund I the Old from 1514 until the establishment of the Polish fief of Duchy of Prussia in 1525. When the Duchy was established, he joined the army of Albert, Duke of Prussia until his death on 1582.

As a member of the army of Albert, he was converted to Protestantism in 1531.

References
 Benians, Ernest Alfred. The Cambridge Modern History, Volume I. The University of Michigan Press, 1909.
 Tuttle, Hubert. History of Prussia: 1134-1740. AMS Press, 1971.
 Wyatt, Walter James. The History of Prussia: Tracing the Origin and Development of Her Military Organization. Nabu Press, 2010.

1493 births
1582 deaths
People from the Duchy of Prussia
Prussian generals